A-77636 is a synthetic drug which acts as a selective D1 receptor full agonist. It has nootropic, anorectic, rewarding and antiparkinsonian effects in animal studies, but its high potency and long duration of action causes D1 receptor downregulation and tachyphylaxis, and unlike other D1 full agonists such as SKF-82,958, it does not produce place preference in animals. A-77636 partially substituted for cocaine in animal studies, and has been suggested for use as a possible substitute drug in treating addiction, but it is better known for its use in studying the role of D1 receptors in the brain.

References 

D1-receptor agonists
Adamantanes
Isochromenes
Catechols